James Patrick "Snipe" Conley (April 25, 1892 – January 7, 1978) was a professional baseball pitcher. He played all or part of three seasons in Major League Baseball, for the Baltimore Terrapins of the Federal League in 1914 and 1915, and for the Cincinnati Reds in 1918. He continued to play in the minors until 1926, then came back at age 47 to pitch in two games for the minor league Dallas Rebels in 1941.

Sources

Major League Baseball pitchers
Baltimore Terrapins players
Cincinnati Reds players
Dallas Giants players
Dallas Marines players
Dallas Submarines players
Dallas Steers players
Dallas Rebels players
Baseball players from Pennsylvania
1890s births
1978 deaths